Philip Spratley (Nottinghamshire, 1942) is an English composer and writer on Essex folksong. He is also a school music teacher and church organist.

Works, editions and recordings
 Music for String Orchestra - Sinfonietta, Op.6. Clarinet Concertino "Byard’s Leap" Op.27, Recorder Concertino "A Gallery of Cats" Op.26. Suite "In Outlaw Country" Op 12b. Linda Merrick, clarinet, John Turner, recorder, Tracey Redfern, trumpet, Eira Lynn Jones, harp, Royal Ballet Sinfonia, Barry Wordsworth. Manchester Sinfonia conducted by the composer. Toccata Classics Philip's music is now handled by Bardic Edition Music Publishers.

References

English composers
1942 births
Living people